The French Chess Federation (French : Fédération Française des Echecs – FFE) is the national organization for chess in France. The president is Diego Salazar, the vice-president is Christophe Leroy and the treasurer is Stéphane Reyreau. The headquarters of the French Chess Federation is Saint-Quentin-en-Yvelines, near Paris. The French federation was founded in 1933.

French chess players
Alphonse Goetz (1865–1934)

See also
French Chess Championship

External links
 

France
Chess in France
Chess
1933 establishments in France
Sports organizations established in 1933
Chess organizations
1933 in chess